The Alte Burg is a levelled early historical fortification in the western part of the Hainich National Park in Germany.

Location 
The castle site is located about 3 kilometres (as the crow flies) northeast of the centre of the village of Berka vor dem Hainich up the "Long Valley" (Langes Tal), through which a medieval road ran to Craula. It lies immediately above the abandoned village of Sülzrieden.

Literature 
 
 
 
 
 
 
 
 Harald Rockstuhl / Frank Störzner: Hainich-Geschichtsbuch - Wanderung durch die Geschichte eines Naturerbes, Verlag Rockstuhl, Bad Langensalza, 3rd revised edition 31 July 2003, 

Castles in Thuringia
Wartburgkreis